Communauté d'agglomération Arlysère is the communauté d'agglomération, an intercommunal structure, centred on the town of Albertville. It is located in the Savoie department, in the Auvergne-Rhône-Alpes region, southeastern France. Created in 2017, its seat is in Albertville. The name Arlysère refers to the rivers Arly and Isère. Its area is 763.6 km2. Its population was 61,292 in 2019, of which 19,502 in Albertville proper.

Composition
The communauté d'agglomération consists of the following 39 communes:

Albertville
Allondaz
La Bâthie
Beaufort
Bonvillard
Césarches
Cevins
Cléry
Cohennoz
Crest-Voland
Esserts-Blay
Flumet
Frontenex
La Giettaz
Gilly-sur-Isère
Grésy-sur-Isère
Grignon
Hauteluce
Marthod
Mercury
Montailleur
Monthion
Notre-Dame-de-Bellecombe
Notre-Dame-des-Millières
Pallud
Plancherine
Queige
Rognaix
Sainte-Hélène-sur-Isère
Saint-Nicolas-la-Chapelle
Saint-Paul-sur-Isère
Saint-Vital
Thénésol
Tournon
Tours-en-Savoie
Ugine
Venthon
Verrens-Arvey
Villard-sur-Doron

References

Arlysere
Arlysere